The Butterworth railway station is a Malaysian railway station located at and named after the town of Butterworth, Penang.

The station is served by the KTM ETS and the KTM Komuter Northern Sector trains. It previously served as the southern end of the International Express from Bangkok, Thailand, which now ends at Padang Besar.

The station is located near to, and linked via covered pedestrian walkways, the Penang Sentral and the Sultan Abdul Hamid Ferry Terminal for ferries to Penang Island.

The end of the line at this station is "Chainage Zero", and as such, regarded as the starting point of the KTM West Coast Line and also the line to Padang Besar, which is connected to the State Railway of Thailand network. All distances for the two lines are measured from the end of the line here.

Location and locality 
The station is located at Butterworth in North Seberang Perai district of Penang, and just easily connected to Butterworth town via Federal Route 1 and also near to Ferry Terminal exit of Butterworth Outer Ring Route (E17).

Due to its connection to the ferry terminal and Penang Sentral bus station, this station has been an important station that serves both Seberang Perai (specifically around Butterworth, Seberang Jaya and Prai) and also Penang Island since its opening. Passengers can change to ferry service to get to Georgetown and further to the rest of the island via local buses, and so does vice versa. Ferries are on an hourly frequency for each direction, but since 2021 is limited to pedestrian only.

Penang Sentral nearby also has a local bus terminal of Seberang Perai sector of Rapid Penang and passenger also can get to various attractions, offices and malls around Butterworth and Seberang Jaya with them.

History
The station began operations in 1967 when the railway swing bridge over the Perai River was opened, allowing the rail line which had prior to this terminated at Perai (also known as Prai and Prye), to continue to Butterworth.

Before the railway line was extended to Butterworth, all rail services began from Perai, where ferries to Penang Island also departed.

The railway line between Prai and Bukit Mertajam was opened in July 1899, and as sections of the West Coast Line were completed, allowed trains to run from Prai to Seremban by 1903, and Johor Bahru by 1909. The line to Padang Besar was completed in 1918, allowing the first International Express to run between Prai and Bangkok's Thonburi Station that year.

New station
On 5 August 2011, the old Butterworth station building was officially closed and subsequently demolished. It was replaced with a temporary station located about 30m away, next to the KTM Bhd (KTMB) parcel office.

A new Butterworth railway station was then built as part of the Electric Double Tracking Project.

Train services
Train services that provided by Keretapi Tanah Melayu serving KTM ETS and KTM Komuter are:
 KTM Komuter Utara: Butterworth–
 ETS Train No. EP9372/EP9371 "Premium": Butterworth– via KL Sentral and 
 ETS Train No. EP9176/EP9171 "Premium": Butterworth–KL Sentral

Former services
 SRT Train 36 International Express: Butterworth–Bangkok
 KTM Intercity Train 01/02 Ekspres Rakyat: Butterworth–KL Sentral–Singapore
 KTM Intercity Train 10/11 Ekspres Sinaran Utara: Butterworth–KL Sentral
 KTM Intercity Train 22 Senandung Mutiara: Butterworth–KL Sentral
 KTM Intercity Train 23 Senandung Mutiara: Butterworth–Singapore

North Butterworth Container Terminal 
The Butterworth station is also connected to a freight terminal known as the North Butterworth Container Terminal (NBCT) to handle freight cargo from the south at Johor and from the north at Thailand (via Padang Besar railway station). Until 1 July 2011, the container terminal also sent shipments and received emptied freight rolling stock to and from Kampong Bahru railyard in Singapore near Tanjong Pagar railway station

Gallery

References

External links

 Butterworth Railway Station at www.keretapi.com
 Butterworth Railway Station at www.mrt.com.my

KTM ETS railway stations
Railway stations opened in 1967